The 1952 Scottish Cup Final was played on 19 April 1952, at Hampden Park in Glasgow and was the final of the 67th Scottish Cup competition. The final was contested by Dundee and Motherwell. Motherwell won the match 4–0 thanks to goals by Jimmy Watson, Willie Redpath, Wilson Humphries and Archie Kelly.

The attendance of 136,274 is a Scottish record for a match not involving Celtic, Rangers or the Scotland national team.

Final

Teams

See also
1951–52 in Scottish football

References

External links
 Video highlights from official Pathé News archive

1952
Cup Final
Scottish Cup Final 1952
Scottish Cup Final 1952
1950s in Glasgow